Rissoina tenuistrata is a species of minute sea snail, a marine gastropod mollusk or micromollusk in the family Rissoinidae.

Description

Distribution
This species occurs in the Indian Ocean off the Aldabra Atoll.

References

 Taylor, J.D. (1973). Provisional list of the mollusca of Aldabra Atoll.

Rissoinidae